Hoseynabad-e Shafi (also Romanized as Ḩoseynābād-e Shafī‘; also known as Deh Shafī‘, Hosein Abad Yoosef, Ḩoseynābād, Ḩoseynābād-e Deh Shafī‘, and Ḩoseynābād-e Ḩājī Yūsef) is a village in Qasemabad Rural District, in the Central District of Rafsanjan County, Kerman Province, Iran. At the 2006 census, its population was 332, in 76 families.

References 

Populated places in Rafsanjan County